Hingalganj Assembly constituency is an assembly constituency in North 24 Parganas district in the Indian state of West Bengal. It is reserved for scheduled castes.

Overview
As per orders of the Delimitation Commission, 126 Hingalganj Assembly constituency (SC) is composed of the following: Hingalganj community development block, and Barunhat Rameshwarpur, Bhabanipur I, Bhabanipur II, Hasnabad, PatliKhanpur gram panchayats of Hasnabad community development block, and Khulna gram panchayat of Sandeshkhali II community development block.

Hingalganj Assembly constituency is part of 18. Basirhat (Lok Sabha constituency).

Members of Legislative Assembly

Election results

2021
In the 2021 election, Debesh Mondal of Trinamool Congress defeated his nearest rival, Nemai Das of BJP.

2016
In the 2016 election, Debesh Mondal of Trinamool Congress defeated his nearest rival, Anandamoy Mondal of CPI.

2011
In the 2011 election, Anandamoy Mondal of CPI defeated his nearest rival Debesh Mondal of Trinamool Congress,

.# Swing calculated on Congress+Trinamool Congress vote percentages taken together in 2006.

2006
In the 2011 assembly elections, Anandamoy  Mondal of CPI won the 99 Hingalganj (SC) assembly seat defeating his nearest rival Debes Mandal of Trinamool Congress. Debes Mandal lost second time from this assembly.

1977-2006
In the 2006 assembly elections, Gopal Gayen of CPI(M) won the 99 Hingalganj (SC) assembly seat defeating his nearest rival Debes Mandal of Trinamool Congress. Contests in most years were multi cornered but only winners and runners are being mentioned. Nripen Gayen of CPI(M) defeated Sourendra Mondal of Trinamool Congress in 2001, Bidyut Kayal of Congress in 1996 and Sankar Roy of Congress in 1991. Sudhanshu Mondal of CPI(M) defeated Aditya Mondal of Congress in 1987 and Amal Krishna Mistry representing Congress in 1982 and representing Janata Party in 1977.

1967-1972
Anil Chandra Mondal of CPI won in 1972. Gopal Chandra Gayen of CPI(M) won in 1971.  Hazari Lal Mondal of CPI won in 1969. B.N. Brahmachari an Independent won in 1967. Prior to that the Hingalganj seat was not there.

References

Assembly constituencies of West Bengal
Politics of North 24 Parganas district